Georges Jules Victor Clairin (11 September 1843, Paris – Pouldu, Clohars-Carnoët 2 September 1919) was a French Orientalist painter and illustrator. He was influenced by Eastern imagery Moorish architecture, and visited North Africa many times, in particular Algeria, Morocco and Egypt. In Paris he led the life of a socialite, and befriended the glamorous actress Sarah Bernhardt, his friend for 50 years, and is today best known for his 'in costume' and informal intimate portraits of her.

Life 

Clairin was apprenticed in the workshops of Isidore Pils and François-Édouard Picot. In 1861 he entered the École des beaux-arts de Paris, and in 1866 first displayed his work. He travelled to Spain with Henri Regnault and to Italy with François Flameng and Jean-Léon Gérôme. He met the Catalan painter Marià Fortuny in Morocco and they visited Tétouan together. In 1895, he travelled to Egypt with the composer Camille Saint-Saëns.

He is best known for his portraits of Sarah Bernhardt, with whom he had a long friendship and whom he depicted in costume for a number of her roles, including as the queen in Ruy Blas (1879), Mélisande in La Princesse Lointaine (1895 and 1899), Cleopatra (1900), Theodora (1902) and Saint Teresa of Ávila; he also showed her in less formal poses. Clairin painted many ceilings, among them the foyers of the Opéra Garnier (1874) and the Le Trident, the theatre of Cherbourg.

He was the uncle of the painter .

Portrait of Sarah Bernhardt, 1876 

Clairin's 1876 portrait of Sarah Bernhardt drew praise. Théodore Véron said of it: 

 
Emile Zola found that: "Mademoiselle Sarah Bernhardt isn't pretty but she has fine intelligent features and Clairin has been able to give her a smooth little face and vulgar sensuality like Cabanel would paint."

Works 

 Entrée à la mosquée du Chérif de Ouassam (1875)
 Les Favorites du sultan (1875)
  À l'extérieur du harem (1875)
 Portrait de Sarah Bernhardt (1876)
 Les brûleuses de varech à la Pointe du Raz (1882)
 Danseuse Ouled-Naïl (1885)
 L'Asie, L'Afrique (1889), Bourse de commerce de Paris
 Le Carnage (1890), Princeton University Art Museum
 Frou-Frou (1892)
 Fête fleurie
 Au balcon
 À l'opéra
 Portrait d'Alexandre Dumas fils
 Soldats français devant le temple de Karnak (1897)
 Sarah Bernhardt en Cléopâtre (1900)
 Retour des conscrits (désert d'Égypte) (1900)
 Marché à Madrid (1907) shown at the salon 
 La Fantasia au Maroc (1907) shown at the salon
 Allah ! Allah ! (1908) shown at the salon
 Au lever du soleil, les moissonneurs arabes font leur prière (1909) shown at the salon
 Portrait de M. Terace à cheval, ministre de France à Tanger

Notes and references

Bibliography 
 Christine Peltre, Dictionnaire culturel de l'orientalisme, Éditions Hazan, Paris, 2008

See also
List of Orientalist artists
Orientalism

External links
 Discussion of Portrait of Sarah Bernhardt by Janina Ramirez and Christophe Leribault: Art Detective Podcast, 12 April 2017

1843 births
1919 deaths
19th-century French painters
20th-century French painters
20th-century French male artists
French male painters
Orientalist painters
19th-century French male artists